Nikolayevka is an urban locality (an urban-type settlement) in Smidovichsky District of the Jewish Autonomous Oblast, Russia. Population:

References

Urban-type settlements in the Jewish Autonomous Oblast